QT or Qt may refer to:

Arts and media
 QT (musician) (born 1988), American pop singer
 QT: QueerTelevision, a 1990s Canadian LGBT newsmagazine show
 Quentin Tarantino (born 1963), American filmmaker
 Question Time (TV programme), a British topical debate panel show (first aired 1979)

Businesses
 QuikTrip, an American convenience store chain
 QT Inc., an American bracelet manufacturer
 QT Hotels & Resorts, an Australasian hospitality provider
 The Qt Company, a Finnish software developer

Science and technology

Computer software
 Qt (software), a cross-platform application framework
 QuickTime, a multimedia technology from Apple Inc.

Heart medicine
 QT interval, on an electrocardiogram
 Long QT syndrome, a rare condition
 Short QT syndrome, a very rare disease

Other uses in science and technology
 Quart (qt), an imperial unit of volume
 Quiet Trader, cargo versions of the BAe 146 airliner

Other uses
 Quality time, periods proactively spent with one's loved ones
 QT (New York City Subway service), a defunct American rapid-transit rail service
 Quantitative tightening, a contractionary monetary policy from a central bank

See also
 Cutie (disambiguation)